Streptomyces celluloflavus is a bacterium species from the genus of Streptomyces which has been isolated from soil in Japan. Streptomyces celluloflavus produces aureothricin and has the ability to degrade cellulose.

See also 
 List of Streptomyces species

References

Further reading

External links
Type strain of Streptomyces celluloflavus at BacDive -  the Bacterial Diversity Metadatabase

celluloflavus
Bacteria described in 1953